
Gmina Siedlec is a rural gmina (administrative district) in Wolsztyn County, Greater Poland Voivodeship, in west-central Poland.

Villages
Gmina Siedlec contains the villages and settlements of Belęcin, Boruja, Chobienice, Godziszewo, Grójec Mały, Grójec Wielki, Jaromierz, Jażyniec, Karna, Kiełkowo, Kiełpiny, Kopanica, Mała Wieś, Mariankowo, Nieborza, Nowa Tuchorza, Reklin, Reklinek, Siedlec, Stara Tuchorza, Tuchorza, Wąchabno, Wielka Wieś, Wojciechowo, Zakrzewo and Żodyń.

Neighbouring gminas
Gmina Siedlec is bordered by the gminas of Babimost, Kargowa, Nowy Tomyśl, Rakoniewice, Wolsztyn and Zbąszyń.

References

External links
 Polish official population figures 2006

Siedlec
Wolsztyn County